Athos Bulcão (July 2, 1918 – July 31, 2008) was a Brazilian painter and sculptor. He was born in Rio de Janeiro.

Biography 
Athos Bulcão was born in Rio de Janeiro on July 2, 1918.

In the 1940s he assisted Cândido Portinari with the "São Francisco de Assis" painting at the Pampulha Church, in Belo Horizonte. Later he moved to Paris, where he lived until 1949.

Returning to Brazil, he became one of the collaborators of the construction of Brasília, taking part in several of Oscar Niemeyer's projects. In 1958 he moved to Brasília, where he lived until his death in 2008.

Athos Bulcão died in Brasília on July 31, 2008, due to complications from Parkinson's disease.

References

External links 
 Athos Bulcão Foundation (in Portuguese)
ATHOS BULCÃO : E A MODERNA AZULEJARIA BRASILEIRA (in Portuguese)

1918 births
2008 deaths
Deaths from Parkinson's disease
Neurological disease deaths in Federal District (Brazil)
Artists from Rio de Janeiro (city)
20th-century Brazilian painters
20th-century Brazilian male artists